Ferdinand Peterson (also Ferdinand Petersen; 13 March 1887 Lehtse Parish, Järva County – 18 February 1979 Chapel Hill, North Carolina, USA) was an Estonian engineer and politician.

From 1918-1919, he was Minister of Roads in Estonian Provisional Government. In 1919, he was a member of Asutav Kogu.

In 1944, he fled the Soviet occupation of Estonia to Germany, and in 1949 he emigrated to the United States.

He was an honorary alumnus of the Estonian Students' Society.

References

1887 births
1979 deaths
Estonian Labour Party politicians
Members of the Estonian Constituent Assembly
Government ministers of Estonia
Estonian World War II refugees
Estonian emigrants to the United States
People from Rakvere Parish